Mushail Mushailov (born July 10, 1941 — January 4, 2007) was a Soviet/Russian artist and teacher of Mountain Jewish descent. He was a member of the USSR Union of Artists and Israel. He was also a laureate of the State Prize of the USSR.

Biography
Mushailov was born in Derbent, Dagestan USSR. In 1967 he graduated from the Moscow State Academic Art College of the Memory of 1905 and in 1973 from V. Surikov Moscow State Academy Art Institute.

For many years Mushailov taught art at the Makhachkala Pedagogical Institute at the Department of Fine Arts and was the executive secretary of the Artists' Union of Dagestan. In 1994 Mushail Mushailov with his family immigrated to Israel. There he continued to work, taking part in various exhibitions; he painted pictures associated with Jewish themes.

After eight years, in 2002, the artist left Israel and returned to Moscow, Russia. He taught drawing, painting and composition at the Moscow State Academic Art College of the Memory of 1905 and in the V. Surikov Moscow State Academy Art Institute.

Serious illness crippled the health of the artist, and in January 2007, Mushail Mushailov, died. Before his death, Mushailov asked his daughters to be buried in Israel. His daughters fulfilled his request. The artist is buried in the cemetery in the town of Yavne, Israel.

Artwork

Paintings "Ballad of a Soldier - Memories" and "Mothers’ Black Shawls", were dedicated to the theme of World War II. Numbers of his works are in Russia, foreign museums and in private collections in Russia, Israel and Canada.

During the artist’s lifetime and posthumously there were written articles about Mushailov’s art.

The author of the book "Art of the Soviet Dagestan" wrote:

Another article "Big Love to the Great Art" wrote:

Awards
 Honored Artist of the Russian Federation.
 Honored Artist of Dagestan.
 State Prize of the Republic of Dagestan.

Gallery

References

External links

 To the Memory of Artist

1941 births
People from Derbent
Russian Jews
Mountain Jews
Jewish painters
Modern painters
20th-century Russian painters
Russian male painters
21st-century Russian painters
Soviet artists
Russian emigrants to Israel
2007 deaths
20th-century Russian male artists
21st-century Russian male artists